Jon Almaas (born 29 August 1967) is a Norwegian TV-host and actor, best known from the weekly comedy Nytt på nytt which he hosted for 17 years.

Career
Almaas got his start on TV3, before moving to the NRK in 1994. Although he initially worked as a producer for the NRK, he would eventually become a household name through hosting the popular show Nytt på Nytt, the Norwegian adaptation of Have I Got News For You. Almaas hosted Nytt på Nytt from its beginning in 1999 until December 2016, when he left NRK. He was replaced by Bård Tufte Johansen, a comedian.

Almaas has also published three books, Slik blir du husets herre (English: This Is How You Become the Master of the House) (2002), Bare så du vet det (English: Just So You Know) (2004) and Den store norske TV-boka: Alt du ikke visste om norske TV-kjendiser (og litt til) (English: The Large Norwegian Television Book: Everything You Didn't Know about Norwegian Television Stars (and a Little Bit More)) (2006).

Private life
Almaas is married to Ellen Christin Heider (a doctor), and they have 2 children together. His sister, Astrid Nylander Almaas, is a physician and panelist on the TV-show Hva feiler det deg? [What's wrong with you?).

Television appearances

Awards

Bibliography
 Slik blir du husets herre (2002), 
 Bare så du vet det (2003), 
 Den store norske TV-boka - alt du ikke visste om norske TV-kjendiser (og litt til) (2006),

References

1967 births
Living people
Norwegian male comedians
Norwegian satirists
Norwegian television personalities
Norwegian writers
People educated at Oslo Waldorf School